The U-23 Men's Softball World Cup is the softball world championship tournament for World Baseball Softball Confederation (WBSC) members’ men's national teams with players under the age of 23, held every four years. The competition will have its inaugural tournament in 2023 in Argentina.

History
The inaugural tournament will be held in Paraná, Argentina from 15 to 23 July 2023. 12 teams will compete in the 2023 event. Due to originally be held in Paraná, Argentina, in October 2022, the tournament was postponed for a number of reasons. The bidding process was reopened and once again awarded to Paraná in Argentina.

Results

1 Originally scheduled to be held in October 2022, but due to a number of reasoons, postponed to April 2023.

Participating nations
 
 
 
 
 
  — Hosts

See also
U-18 Men's Softball World Cup

References

External links
  Official website 

World championships in softball
World Baseball Softball Confederation competitions
Under-23 sport